Aladdin (ATU 561, ‘Aladdin') is a Middle-Eastern folk tale. It is one of the best-known tales associated with The Book of One Thousand and One Nights (The Arabian Nights), despite not being part of the original text; it was added by the Frenchman Antoine Galland, based on a folk tale that he heard from the Syrian Maronite storyteller Hanna Diyab.

Sources

Known along with Ali Baba as one of the "orphan tales", the story was not part of the original Nights collection and has no authentic Arabic textual source, but was incorporated into the book Les mille et une nuits by its French translator, Antoine Galland.

John Payne quotes passages from Galland's unpublished diary: recording Galland's encounter with a Maronite storyteller from Aleppo, Hanna Diyab. According to Galland's diary, he met with Hanna, who had travelled from Aleppo to Paris with celebrated French traveller Paul Lucas, on March 25, 1709. Galland's diary further reports that his transcription of "Aladdin" for publication occurred in the winter of 1709–10. It was included in his volumes ix and x of the Nights, published in 1710, without any mention or published acknowledgment of Hanna's contribution.

Payne also records the discovery in the Bibliothèque Nationale in Paris of two Arabic manuscripts containing Aladdin (with two more of the "interpolated" tales). One was written by a Syrian Christian priest living in Paris, named Dionysios Shawish, alias Dom Denis Chavis. The other is supposed to be a copy Mikhail Sabbagh made of a manuscript written in Baghdad in 1703. It was purchased by the Bibliothèque Nationale at the end of the nineteenth century. As part of his work on the first critical edition of the Nights, Iraq's Muhsin Mahdi has shown that both these manuscripts are "back-translations" of Galland's text into Arabic.

Ruth B. Bottigheimer and Paulo Lemos Horta have argued that Hanna Diyab should be understood as the original author of some of the stories he supplied, and even that several of Diyab's stories (including Aladdin) were partly inspired by Diyab's own life, as there are parallels with his autobiography.

Plot summary

The story is often retold with variations. The following is a précis of the Burton translation of 1885.

Aladdin is an impoverished young ne'er-do-well, dwelling in "one of the cities of China". He is recruited by a sorcerer from the Maghreb, who passes himself off as the brother of Aladdin's late father, Mustapha the tailor, convincing Aladdin and his mother of his good will by pretending to set up the lad as a wealthy merchant. The sorcerer's real motive is to persuade young Aladdin to retrieve a wonderful oil lamp (chirag) from a booby-trapped magic cave. After the sorcerer attempts to double-cross him, Aladdin finds himself trapped in the cave. Aladdin is still wearing a magic ring the sorcerer has lent him. When he rubs his hands in despair, he inadvertently rubs the ring and a genie appears and releases him from the cave, allowing him to return to his mother while in possession of the lamp. When his mother tries to clean the lamp, so they can sell it to buy food for their supper, a second far more powerful genie appears who is bound to do the bidding of the person holding the lamp.

With the aid of the genie of the lamp, Aladdin becomes rich and powerful and marries Princess Badroulbadour, the sultan's daughter (after magically foiling her marriage to the vizier's son). The genie builds Aladdin and his bride a wonderful palace, far more magnificent than the sultan's.

The sorcerer hears of Aladdin's good fortune, and returns; he gets his hands on the lamp by tricking Aladdin's wife (who is unaware of the lamp's importance) by offering to exchange "new lamps for old". He orders the genie of the lamp to take the palace, along with all its contents, to his home in the Maghreb. Aladdin still has the magic ring and is able to summon the lesser genie. The genie of the ring cannot directly undo any of the magic of the genie of the lamp, but he is able to transport Aladdin to the Maghreb where, with the help of the "woman's wiles" of the princess, he recovers the lamp and slays the sorcerer, returning the palace to its proper place.

The sorcerer's more powerful and evil brother plots to destroy Aladdin for killing his brother by disguising himself as an old woman known for her healing powers. Badroulbadour falls for his disguise and commands the "woman" to stay in her palace in case of any illnesses. Aladdin is warned of this danger by the genie of the lamp and slays the impostor.

Aladdin eventually succeeds to his father-in-law's throne.

Setting
The opening sentences of the story, in both the Galland and the Burton versions, set it in "one of the cities of China". On the other hand, there is practically nothing in the rest of the story that is inconsistent with a Middle Eastern setting. For instance, the ruler is referred to as "Sultan" rather than "Emperor", as in some retellings, and the people in the story are Muslims and their conversation is filled with Muslim platitudes. A Jewish merchant buys Aladdin's wares, but there is no mention of Buddhists, Daoists or Confucians.

Notably, ethnic groups in Chinese history have long included Muslim groups, including large populations of Uighurs, and the Hui people as well as the Tajiks whose origins go back to Silk Road travelers. Islamic communities have been known to exist in the region since the Tang dynasty (which rose to power simultaneously with the prophet Muhammad's career.) Some have suggested that the intended setting may be Turkestan (encompassing Central Asia and the modern-day Chinese autonomous region of Xinjiang in Western China).

For all this, speculation about a "real" Chinese setting depends on a knowledge of China that the teller of a folk tale (as opposed to a geographic expert) might well not possess. In early Arabic usage, China is known to have been used in an abstract sense to designate an exotic, faraway land.

Motifs and variants

Tale type
The story of Aladdin is classified in the Aarne–Thompson–Uther Index as tale type ATU 561, "Aladdin", after the character. In the Index, the Aladdin story is situated next to two similar tale types: ATU 560, The Magic Ring, and ATU 562, The Spirit in the Blue Light. All stories deal with a down-on-his-luck and impoverished boy or soldier, who finds a magical item (ring, lamp, tinderbox) that grants his wishes. In this tale type, the magical item is stolen, but eventually recovered thanks to the use of another magical object.

Distribution
Since its appearance in The One Thousand and One Nights, the tale has integrated into oral tradition. Scholars Ton Deker and Theo Meder located variants across Europe and the Middle East.

An Indian variant has been attested, titled The Magic Lamp and collected among the Santal people.

Adaptations

Adaptations vary in their faithfulness to the original story. In particular, difficulties with the Chinese setting are sometimes resolved by giving the story a more typical Arabian Nights background.

Books
 One of the many literary retellings of the tale appears in A Book of Wizards (1966) and A Choice of Magic (1971), by Ruth Manning-Sanders. Another is the early Penguin version for children, Aladdin and His Wonderful Lamp, illustrated by John Harwood with many Chinese details; the translator or re-teller is not acknowledged. This was a "Porpoise" imprint printed in 1947 and released in 1948.
 Aladdin: Master of the Lamp (1992), edited by Mike Resnick and Martin H. Greenberg, is an anthology containing 43 original short stories inspired by the tale.
 "The Nobility of Faith" by Jonathan Clements, in the anthology Doctor Who Short Trips: The Ghosts of Christmas (2007), is a retelling of the Aladdin story in the style of the Arabian Nights, but featuring the Doctor in the role of the genie.

Comics

Western comics
 In 1962, the Italian branch of Walt Disney Productions published the story Paperino e la grotta di Aladino (Donald and Aladdin's Cave), written by Osvaldo Pavese and drawn by Pier Lorenzo De Vita. As in many pantomimes, the plot is combined with elements of the Ali Baba story: Uncle Scrooge leads Donald Duck and their nephews on an expedition to find the treasure of Aladdin and they encounter the Middle Eastern counterparts of the Beagle Boys. Scrooge describes Aladdin as a brigand who used the legend of the lamp to cover the origins of his ill-gotten gains. They find the cave holding the treasure—blocked by a huge rock requiring a magic password ("open sesame") to open.
 The original version of the comic book character Green Lantern was partly inspired by the Aladdin myth; the protagonist discovers a "lantern-shaped power source and a 'power ring which gives him power to create and control matter.
 In the Elseworlds series, there was even a story that combined the Green Lantern mythos with that of Aladdin called Green Lantern: 1001 Emerald Nights.

Manga
 The Japanese manga series Magi: The Labyrinth of Magic is not a direct adaptation, but features Aladdin as the main character of the story and includes many characters from other One Thousand and One Nights stories. An adaptation of this comic to an anime television series was made in October 2012 in which Aladdin is voiced by Kaori Ishihara in Japanese and Erica Mendez in English.

Pantomimes

 In the United Kingdom, the story of Aladdin was dramatised in 1788 by John O'Keefe for the Theatre Royal, Covent Garden. It has been a popular subject for pantomime for over 200 years.
 The traditional Aladdin pantomime is the source of the well-known pantomime character Widow Twankey (Aladdin's mother). In pantomime versions, changes in the setting and story are often made to fit it better into "China" (albeit a China situated in the East End of London rather than medieval Baghdad), and elements of other Arabian Nights tales (in particular Ali Baba) are often introduced into the plot. One version of the "pantomime Aladdin" is Sandy Wilson's musical Aladdin, from 1979.
 Since the early 1990s, Aladdin pantomimes have tended to be influenced by the Disney animation. For instance, the 2007/8 production at the Birmingham Hippodrome starring John Barrowman featured songs from the Disney movies Aladdin and Mulan.

Other musical theatre 

 The New Aladdin was a successful Edwardian musical comedy in 1906.
Adam Oehlenschläger wrote his verse drama Aladdin in 1805. Carl Nielsen wrote incidental music for this play in 1918–19. Ferruccio Busoni set some verses from the last scene of Oehlenschläger's Aladdin in the last movement of his Piano Concerto, Op. 39.
 In 1958, a musical comedy version of Aladdin was written especially for U.S. television, with a book by S. J. Perelman and music and lyrics by Cole Porter. A London stage production followed in 1959, in which a 30-year-old Bob Monkhouse played the part of Aladdin at the Coliseum Theatre.
 Aladdin, Prince Street Players version; book by Jim Eiler, music by Jim Eiler and Jeanne Bargy, lyrics by Jim Eiler.
 Broadway Junior has released Aladdin Jr., a children's musical based on the music and screenplay of the Disney animation.
 The Disney's Aladdin: A Musical Spectacular musical stage show ran at Disney California Adventure from January 2003 to January 10, 2016.
 StarKid Productions released the musical Twisted on YouTube n 2013, a parody of the 1992 Disney film that is told from the royal vizier's point of view.
 A Disney Theatrical Production of Aladdin opened in 2011 in Seattle, in Toronto in 2013, and on Broadway at the New Amsterdam Theatre on March 20, 2014.

Theatrical films

Animation: Europe and Asia 
 The 1926 animated film The Adventures of Prince Achmed (the earliest surviving animated feature film) combined the story of Aladdin with that of the prince. In this version the princess Aladdin pursues is Achmed's sister and the sorcerer is his rival for her hand. The sorcerer steals the castle and the princess through his own magic and then sets a monster to attack Aladdin, from which Achmed rescues him. Achmed then informs Aladdin he requires the lamp to rescue his own intended wife, Princess Pari Banou, from the demons of the Island of Wak Wak. They convince the Witch of the Fiery Mountain to defeat the sorcerer, and then all three heroes join forces to battle the demons.
 The animated feature Aladdin et la lampe merveilleuse by Film Jean Image was released in 1970 in France. The story contains many of the original elements of the story as compared to the Disney version.
A Thousand and One Nights is a 1969 Japanese adult  anime feature film directed by Eiichi Yamamoto, conceived by Osamu Tezuka. The film is a first part of Mushi Production's Animerama, a series of films aimed at an adult audience.
An elderly version of Aladdin appears as a protagonist in the 1975 anime series Arabian Nights: Sinbad's Adventures.
 Aladdin and the Magic Lamp was a rendition in Japanese directed by Yoshikatsu Kasai, produced in Japan by Toei Animation and released in the United States by The Samuel Goldwyn Company in 1982.
 Son of Aladdin is a 2003 Indian 3D-animated fantasy-adventure film by Singeetam Srinivasa Rao, produced by Pentamedia Graphics. It follows the adventures of the son of Aladdin and his fight with an evil sorcerer.

Animation: USA 
 In the 1934 short film, Aladdin and the Wonderful Lamp, Aladdin is a child laborer who finds a magic lamp and uses it to become a prince.IMDb
 In the 1938 animated film Have You Got Any Castles?, Aladdin makes a brief appearance asking for help but gets punched by one of the Three Musketeers.
 Aladdin and His Wonderful Lamp is a 1939 Popeye the Sailor cartoon.
 The 1959 animated film 1001 Arabian Nights starring Mr. Magoo as Aladdin's uncle and produced by UPA.
Aladdin is a 48-minute animated film based on the classic Arabian Nights story "Aladdin and the magic lamp", translated by Antoine Galland. Aladdin was produced by Golden Films and the American Film Investment Corporation. Like all other Golden Films productions, the film featured a single theme song, "Rub the Lamp", written and composed by Richard Hurwitz and John Arrias. It was released direct to video on April 27, 1992 by GoodTimes Home Video (months before Disney's version was released), and was reissued on DVD in 2002 as part of the distributor's Collectible Classics line of products.
 Aladdin, the 1992 animated feature by Walt Disney Feature Animation (currently the best-known retelling of the story). In this version, several characters are renamed or amalgamated. For instance, the Sorcerer and the Sultan's vizier were combined into one character named Jafar, while the Princess is renamed Jasmine. They have new motivations for their actions. The Genie of the Lamp only grants three wishes and desires freedom from his role. A sentient magic carpet replaces the ring's genie, while Jafar uses a royal magic ring to find Aladdin. The names "Jafar" and "Abu", the Sultan's delight in toys, and their physical appearances are borrowed from the 1940 film The Thief of Bagdad. The setting is moved from China to the fictional Arabian city of Agrabah, and the structure of the plot is simplified.
 The Return of Jafar (1994), the first direct-to-video sequel to the 1992 Walt Disney movie.
 Aladdin and the King of Thieves (1996), the direct-to-video second and final sequel to the 1992 Walt Disney movie.

Live-action: English language films
 Aladdin and the Wonderful Lamp (1917), directed by Chester M. Franklin and Sidney A. Franklin and released by the Fox Film Corporation, told the story using child actors. It is the earliest known filmed adaptation of the story.
 The 1940 British movie The Thief of Bagdad borrows elements of the Aladdin story, although it also departs from the original story fairly freely: for instance the genie grants only three wishes and the minor character of the Emperor's vizier is renamed Jaffar and becomes the main villain, replacing the sorcerer from the original plot.
Arabian Nights is a 1942 adventure film directed by John Rawlins and starring Sabu, Maria Montez, Jon Hall and Leif Erickson.  The film is derived from The Book of One Thousand and One Nights but owes more to the imagination of Universal Pictures than the original Arabian stories. Unlike other films in the genre (The Thief of Bagdad), it features no monsters or supernatural elements.
 A Thousand and One Nights (1945) is a tongue-in-cheek Technicolor fantasy film set in the Baghdad of the One Thousand and One Nights, starring Cornel Wilde as Aladdin, Evelyn Keyes as the genie of the magic lamp, Phil Silvers as Aladdin's larcenous sidekick, and Adele Jergens as the princess Aladdin loves.
 The Wonders of Aladdin is a 1961 film directed by Mario Bava and Henry Levin and starring Donald O'Connor as Aladdin.  This film has a more working-class focus: Aladdin helps the prince (Mario Girotti) and princess (as does a fakir) but never becomes one and ends up in a romantic relationship with his neighbor, Djalma (Noelle Adam).  The genie (Vittorio De Sica) can grant only three wishes (although what constitutes as a single wish is quite malleable, probably due to his sympathies with Aladdin) and shrinks with each one, which is leading to his eternal rest after 12,000 years.
 A 1998 direct-to-video movie A Kid in Aladdin's Palace directed by Robert L. Levy which is a sequel to A Kid in King Arthur's Court.
Adventures of Aladdin (2019), a mockbuster produced by The Asylum.
 Aladdin, a Disney live-action remake of the 1992 animated film, released in 2019. It stars Mena Massoud as the title character, Naomi Scott as Jasmine, Marwan Kenzari as Jafar, and Will Smith as the Genie.

Live-action: Non-English language films
 Aladdin and the Wonderful Lamp is a 1927 Indian silent film, by Bhagwati Prasad Mishra, based on the folktale.
 Alladin and the Wonderful Lamp is a 1931 Indian silent film, adapted from the folktale, by Jal Ariah.
 Aladdin Aur Jadui Chirag (Aladdin and the Wonderful Lamp) is a 1933 Indian Hindi-language fantasy-adventure film by Jal Ariah. A remake of the 1931 film in sound.
 Aaj Ka Aladdin (Today's Aladdin) is a 1935 Indian Hindi-language film by Nagendra Majumdar. It is a modern retelling of the folktale.
 Aladdin Aur Jadui Chirag (Aladdin and the Wonderful Lamp) is a 1937 Indian Hindi-language film adaptation by Navinchandra.
 Aladdin Aur Jadui Chirag (Aladdin and the Wonderful Lamp) is a 1952 Indian Hindi-language musical fantasy-adventure film by Homi Wadia, starring Mahipal as Aladdin and Meena Kumari as Princess Badar.
 Alif-Laila is a 1955 Indian Hindi-language fantasy film by K. Amarnath, Vijay Kumar portrays the character of Aladdin with actress Nimmi as the female genie.
 Chirag-e-Cheen (Lamp of China) is a 1955 Indian Hindi-language film adaptation by G.P. Pawar and C. M. Trivedi.
 Alladin Ka Beta (Son of Alladin) is a 1955 Indian Hindi-language action film, it follows the story of the son of Alladin.
 Alladin and the Wonderful Lamp is a 1957 Indian fantasy film by T. R. Raghunath. Based on the story of Aladdin, it was simultaneously filmed in Telugu, Tamil and Hindi with Akkineni Nageshwara Rao portraying the titular character.
 Alladdin Laila is a 1957 Indian Hindi-language film by Lekhraj Bhakri, starring Mahipal, Lalita Pawar and Shakila.
 Sindbad Alibaba and Aladdin is a 1965 Indian Hindi-language musical fantasy-adventure film by Prem Narayan Arora. It features the three most popular characters from the Arabian Nights. Very loosely based on the original, in which the heroes get to meet and share in each other's adventures. In this version, the lamp's jinni (genie) is female and Aladdin marries her rather than the princess (she becomes a mortal woman for his sake).
 Main Hoon Aladdin (I am Aladdin) is a 1965 Indian Hindi-language film by Mohammed Hussain, starring Ajit in the titular role.
 A Soviet film Volshebnaia Lampa Aladdina ("Aladdin's Magic Lamp") was released in 1966.
 A Mexican production, Pepito y la Lampara Maravillosa was made en 1972, where comedian Chabelo plays the role of the genie who grant wishes to a young kid called Pepito in 1970s Mexico City.
 Adventures of Aladdin is a 1978 Indian Hindi-language adventure-film based on the tale, by Homi Wadia.
 Allauddinum Albhutha Vilakkum (Aladdin and the Magic Lamp) is a 1979 Indian adventure fantasy-drama film by I. V. Sasi. It was simultaneously filmed in Malayalam and Tamil with Kamal Haasan in the titular role.
 In 1986, an Italian production (under supervision of Golan-Globus) of a modern-day Aladdin was filmed in Miami under the title Superfantagenio, starring actor Bud Spencer as the genie and his daughter Diamante as the daughter of a police sergeant.
 Aladin is a 2009 Indian Hindi-language fantasy action film directed by Sujoy Ghosh. The film stars Ritesh Deshmukh in the titular role, along with Amitabh Bachchan, Jacqueline Fernandez and Sanjay Dutt.
 The New Adventures of Aladdin, France modern retelling of the tale of Aladdin.
 Alad’2, second sequel to the French movie The New Adventures of Aladdin (2018).
 Ashchorjyo Prodeep is a 2013 Indian Bengali-language film by Anik Dutta. This  film is based on a Shirshendu Mukhopadhyay novel of the same name and deals with the issues of consumerism. It is a modern adaptation of Aladdin about the story of a middle-class man (played by Saswata Chatterjee) who accidentally finds a magic lamp containing a Jinn (played by Rajatava Dutta).
 Aladin Saha Puduma Pahana was released in 2018 in Sri Lanka in Sinhala language.

Television

Animation: English language
 Aladdin is a 1958 musical fantasy written especially for television with a book by S.J. Perelman and music and lyrics by Cole Porter, telecast in color on the DuPont Show of the Month by CBS.
 "Aladdin and the Magic Lamp", an episode of Rabbit Ears Productions' We All Have Tales series, televised on PBS in 1991, featuring John Hurt as narrator, with illustrations by Greg Couch and music by Mickey Hart. This version is set in Isfahan, Persia, and closely follows the original plot, including the origin of the sorcerer. The audiobook version was nominated for a Grammy Award for Best Spoken Word Album for Children in 1994.
 Aladdin, an animated series produced by Disney based on their movie adaptation that ran from 1994 to 1995.
Aladdin featured in an episode of Happily Ever After: Fairy Tales for Every Child. The story was set in "Ancient China", but otherwise had a tenuous connection with the original plot.
 Magi, Alladin, a young magi, befriends a Jin and goes adventuring with Alibaba. (2013) Japanese, English dub available

Live-action: English language
 Aladdin appeared in episode 297 of Sesame Street performed by Frank Oz. This version was made from a large lavender live-hand Anything Muppet.
 A segment of the Marty Feldman episode of The Muppet Show retells the story of Aladdin with The Great Gonzo in the role of Aladdin and Marty Feldman playing the genie of the lamp.
 A 1967 TV movie was based on the Prince Street Players stage musical. This version is very close to the touring musical with about 15 minutes cut to be adapted into the 50 minutes tv program. It had Will B. Able as the Genii and Fred Grades as Aladdin.
 In 1986, the program Faerie Tale Theatre based an episode on the story called "Aladdin and His Wonderful Lamp", directed by Tim Burton and starring Robert Carradine as Aladdin and James Earl Jones as both the ring Genie and the lamp Genie.
 In 1990 Disney made a direct to TV movie based on the Prince Street Players stage musical, starring Barry Bostwick.
 Aladdin features as one of five stories in the Hallmark Entertainment TV miniseries Arabian Nights in 2000, featuring Jason Scott Lee as Aladdin and John Leguizamo as both of the genies.
 The characters of Aladdin, Jasmine, Jafar and the Sultan, along with Agrabah as the setting and the genie of the lamp were adapted into the sixth season of TV series Once Upon a Time, with Aladdin portrayed by Deniz Akdeniz, Jasmine portrayed by Karen David, and Jafar portrayed by Oded Fehr. Jafar previously appeared in the spin-off Once Upon a Time in Wonderland, portrayed by Naveen Andrews. Both were produced by ABC Television Studios and based on the Disney version of the story.
 Syfy released a made-for-TV horror adaptation called Aladdin and the Death Lamp on September 15, 2012.

Live-action: Non-English language 
 In Kyōryū Sentai Zyuranger, the sixteenth installment of the long-running Super Sentai metaseries, the Djinn (voiced by Eisuke Yoda) that appears in the eleventh episode ("My Master!" Transcription: "Goshujin-sama!" (Japanese: ご主人さま!)) reveals that he was the genie from the tale of "Aladdin and the Magic Lamp", which did take place.
 The story of Aladdin was featured in Alif Laila, an Indian TV series directed by Ramanand Sagar in 1994 and telecasted on DD National.
 Aladdin – Jaanbaaz Ek Jalwe Anek (2007–2009), an Indian fantasy television series based on the story of Aladdin that aired on Zee TV, starring Mandar Jadhav in the titular role of Aladdin.
 Aladdin - Naam Toh Suna Hoga (2018–2021), a live-action Indian fantasy television show on SAB TV starring Siddharth Nigam as Aladdin and Avneet Kaur/Ashi Singh as Yasmine.

Video games
 A number of video games were based on the Disney movie:
 The Genesis version (also on Amiga, MS-DOS, NES, Game Boy, and Game Boy Color) by Virgin Games.
 The SNES version (also on Game Boy Advance) by Capcom.
 The Master System version (also on Game Gear) by SIMS.
 Nasira's Revenge for the PlayStation and Windows by Argonaut Games.
 The Disney version of Aladdin appears throughout the Disney/Square Enix crossover series Kingdom Hearts, with Agrabah being a visitable world.
 The video game Sonic and the Secret Rings is heavily based on the story of Aladdin, and both genies appear in the story. The genie of the lamp is the main antagonist, known in the game as the Erazor Djinn, and the genie of the ring, known in the game as Shahra, appears as Sonic's sidekick and guide through the game. Furthermore, the ring genie is notably lesser than the lamp genie in the story.
 In 2010, Anuman Interactive launched Aladin and the Enchanted Lamp, a hidden object game on PC and Mac.
 In 2016 Saturn Animation Studio produced an interactive adaptation of The Magical Lamp of Aladdin for mobile devices.

Pachinko
Sega Sammy have released a line of pachinko machines based on Aladdin since 1989. Sega Sammy have sold over 570,000 Aladdin pachinko machines in Japan, .

Gallery

See also
 54521 Aladdin, asteroid
 Arabian mythology
 Genies in popular culture
 The Bronze Ring
 Jack and His Golden Snuff-Box
 The Tinderbox
 The Blue Light
 Three wishes joke

References

Bibliography

Further reading

External links

 
 Aladdin, or, The wonderful lamp, by Adam Gottlob Oehlenschläger, William Blackwood & Sons, 1863
 "Alaeddin and the Enchanted Lamp", in John Payne, Oriental Tales vol. 13
 The Thousand Nights and a Night in several classic translations, with additional material, including Payne's introduction  and quotes from Galland's diary.

 
One Thousand and One Nights characters
Fictional Arabs
Fictional Chinese people
Male characters in literature
Male characters in fairy tales
Articles containing video clips
ATU 560-649